Philipp Eitzinger is a Grand Prix motorcycle racer from Austria.

Career statistics

By season

Races by year

References

1990 births
Living people
Austrian motorcycle racers
125cc World Championship riders